Katharine Hepburn (May 12, 1907 - June 29, 2003) was an American actress of the 20th century, active in 44 feature films, 8 telemovies and 33 stage plays over 66 years from 1928 and 1994.

Hepburn began her career in theatre in 1928, and later appeared on the stage in every decade up until the 1980s. Productions Hepburn played in ranged from Shakespeare, to Philip Barry comedies, work by George Bernard Shaw, and a musical.

Hepburn made her film debut in A Bill of Divorcement in 1932. Over the next six decades, she appeared in a range of genres, including screwball comedies, period dramas, and adaptations of works by notable playwrights Tennessee Williams, Eugene O'Neill, and Edward Albee. 

Her final appearance in a theatrically released film was a supporting role in Love Affair in 1994. Hepburn first appeared in a television film in 1973, and later continued to appear in the medium until she gave the final performance of her career in One Christmas in 1994. Hepburn also presented two documentaries for television, and narrated two short documentaries.

Screen

Feature films

Television films

Short subjects

Box Office Ranking

1934 - 11th
1935 - 23rd
1968 - 18th
1969 - 9th
1970 - 20th
1982 - 12th

Theatre

See also

List of awards and nominations received by Katharine Hepburn

References
 
 
 
 
 

 
Actress filmographies
American filmographies